Carlos Gallegos (born 28 May 1992) is a Mexican professional boxer.

Amateur career
Carlos had an amateur career record of 37–3. He went on to win a bronze medal at the 2008 Cadet Mexican National Championships and a gold medal at the Mexican National Championships in the middleweight division.

Professional career
On 2 October 2010, Gallegos beat the veteran Miguel Angel Galindo at the Estadio de Beisbol in Monterrey, Nuevo León, Mexico.

References

External links

Boxers from Nuevo León
Sportspeople from Monterrey
Super-middleweight boxers
1992 births
Living people
Mexican male boxers